is a former professional boxer who held the world junior lightweight championship.

Professional boxing career
Kobayashi turned pro in 1962 and won the Lineal, WBC and WBA Super Featherweight Title in 1967 by defeating Yoshiaki Numata by 12th-round KO, in a bout where Numata was down once in the 6th and three times in the 12th round and thus Kobayashi becoming the undisputed Super Featherweight champion of the world. He was stripped of his WBA title after failing to fight Rene Barrientos.
He defended the title six times before losing the belt to Alfredo Marcano in 1971.  He retired later in the year after losing by knockout in the 7th round against Roberto Durán in Panama.

See also 
 List of super-featherweight boxing champions
 List of WBA world champions
 List of WBC world champions
 List of The Ring world champions
 List of undisputed boxing champions
 List of Japanese boxing world champions
 Boxing in Japan

References

External links
 
Hiroshi Kobayashi - CBZ Profile

|-

|-

|-

1944 births
Living people
World Boxing Association champions
World Boxing Council champions
The Ring (magazine) champions
World super-featherweight boxing champions
World boxing champions
Japanese male boxers